Park Pobedy is a station of the Moscow Metro in the city's Dorogomilovo District. It is on two lines: the Arbatsko-Pokrovskaya line and the Kalininsko-Solntsevskaya line. At  underground, according to the official figures, it is the deepest metro station in Moscow and one of the deepest in the world (after Kyiv Metro's Arsenalna, Chongqing Rail Transit's Hongtudi station and Saint Petersburg Metro's Admiralteyskaya).

Services 

The Arbatsko-Pokrovskaya line serves the station with trains running from Pyatnitskoye Shosse in the northwest via Park Pobedy and central Moscow to Shchyolkovskaya in the northeast of the city.

Until 16 March 2017, the Kalininsko-Solntsevskaya line's western section had only two stations, Park Pobedy and Delovoy Tsentr. An extension to the south, opened on that day, connected Park Pobedy first with Ramenki via two other stations. Eventually it is planned to be extended to Rasskazovka, near Vnukovo International Airport.

Park Pobedy allows cross-platform interchange between the two lines across the station's two island platforms.

History 
Construction began in 1986. The initial plans envisaged connections from the Arbatsko-Pokrovskaya line to the future Mitino–Butovskaya and the Solntsevo–Mytischinskaya Chordal lines. The former was accommodated in the station's design, with two additional tracks included parallel to those of the Arbatsko-Pokrovskaya line (the latter would have used a third set of track perpendicular to these). However, the 1990s financial crises ended the Chordal projects; the station opened in 2003 as a terminus of the Arbatsko-Pokrovskaya line, and in 2008 the Strogino–Mitino extension of the Arbatsko-Pokrovskaya line was begun from Park Pobedy. The second set of tracks saw their first use on 31 January 2014 as part of the Kalininsko-Solntsevskaya line's partial service to Delovoy Tsentr.

Design 
This is the only Moscow metro station where all passengers board and alight trains in different locations. A further complication was that only the southern, or inbound, platform had an entrance vestibule, so passengers arriving at the northern, or outbound, platform had to change platforms to leave the station. This, however, changed in March 2017, when the southern platform was connected directly to the entrance by a new escalator tunnel. The main reason for this was the opening of new section of Kalininsko-Solntsevskaya line, which now terminates at Ramenki instead of Park Pobedy.

At  underground, Park Pobedy is the deepest station in Moscow and the fourth-deepest in the world by mean depth, after Kyiv Metro's , Chongqing Rail Transit's Hongtudi station and Saint Petersburg Metro's Admiralteyskaya, and is the deepest station by maximum depth, . The escalator ride to the surface takes approximately three minutes.

The two platforms, the work of architects Nataliya Shurygina and Nikolay Shumakov, are of identical design but have opposite colour schemes. The pylons of the outbound platform are faced with red marble on the transverse faces and pale grey marble on the longitudinal faces. The inbound platform is the exact reverse. The station is adorned with two large mosaics by Zurab Tsereteli depicting the 1812 French Invasion of Russia (at the end of the inbound platform) and World War II (on the outbound platform).

The station has a unique structural design. Instead of traditional cast iron tunnel lining Park Pobedy lining included steel blocks filled with concrete. It significantly reduced amount of structural metal and consequentially overall cost of construction.

Gallery

References

External links

metro.ru — Park Pobedy station
KartaMetro.info — Station location and exits on Moscow map (English/Russian)
Park Pobedy: 165th station of the Moscow Metro

Buildings and structures completed in 2003
Moscow Metro stations
Railway stations in Russia opened in 2003
Railway stations with vitreous enamel panels
Arbatsko-Pokrovskaya Line
Kalininsko-Solntsevskaya line
Railway stations located underground in Russia